Staikos Vergetis (born 11 July 1976) is a Greek professional football manager who is the current manager of I-League club RoundGlass Punjab.

Managerial career

OF Ierapetra
On 29 June 2021, Greek Football League club OF Ierapetra announced Vergetis as the new manager of the club.

RoundGlass Punjab
In August 2022, I-League club RoundGlass Punjab appointed Vergetis as head coach. He led the club winning the I-League trophy in 2023, which ensured their promotion to 2023–24 Indian Super League.

References

1976 births
Living people
Greek football managers
Asteras Tripolis F.C. managers
Nea Salamis Famagusta FC managers
Doxa Drama F.C. managers
Niki Volos F.C. managers
O.F. Ierapetra F.C. managers
Expatriate football managers in Cyprus
Greek expatriate sportspeople in Cyprus
Footballers from Tripoli, Greece
RoundGlass Punjab FC managers